Edward "Eddie" Alvarez (born January 11, 1984) is an American mixed martial artist who most recently competed in the Lightweight (170 lb) division of ONE Championship. He also formerly competed in the UFC and Bellator MMA, winning world titles in each: the UFC Lightweight Championship once and the Bellator Lightweight World Championship twice. Alvarez was the first Lightweight champion in Bellator MMA. He has also competed for the Japanese DREAM promotion, where he fought in their inaugural Lightweight Grand Prix. Alvarez also fought once for ProElite's EliteXC.

Alvarez is the first fighter to have won championships in both Bellator MMA and the UFC. He holds notable wins over former world champions Pat Curran, Michael Chandler, Shinya Aoki, Gilbert Melendez, Justin Gaethje, Anthony Pettis, Eduard Folayang and Rafael dos Anjos. Fight Matrix ranks him #3 All-Time Lightweight in the world (behind Khabib Nurmagomedov and B.J. Penn).

Background
Edward, the son of Louis and Lillian Alvarez, grew up in Kensington, Philadelphia and is of Puerto Rican and Irish descent. He started boxing at Front Street Gym at the age of eight under his father and Frank Kubach. At the age of 11, Alvarez started wrestling in a youth wrestling program.

He went to Northeast Catholic High School, excelling and becoming a varsity letterman in football, wrestling and track. Despite receiving partial scholarship offers to wrestle in various colleges after graduating in 2001, he decided to pursue a career in mixed martial arts.

Eddie has a younger brother, Albert, who is a former mixed martial artist.

Mixed martial arts career
Alvarez claims to have fought over 100 unsanctioned bouts before starting as a professional fighter as there were no amateur fights available. He paid $250 for a slot in Ring of Combat 5 to start his professional mixed martial arts career in 2003.

Alvarez won the MFC Welterweight Championship in his seventh professional fight in June 2006, when he defeated Derrick Noble via KO at 1:01 of the first round. The MFC Welterweight Championship would later be re-branded the BodogFIGHT Welterweight Championship.

In spite of the fact that many insiders did not consider 170 pounds to be Alvarez's best competitive fighting weight, he continued to fight larger opponents, as he relished testing his mettle against bigger fighters. At Bodog Fight's "Clash of the Nations" pay per view in Russia on April 14, 2007, Alvarez's size disadvantage would be exposed, as he suffered his first career loss when he was TKO'd by UFC veteran Nick Thompson at 4:32 into round 2.
After deciding to leave Bodog, Alvarez signed with EliteXC. He competed in their 160-pound division against Ross Ebanez, winning by TKO.

A few weeks prior to the first event, it was announced that the Japanese promotion DREAM, started by the minds behind PRIDE FC and K-1 had signed Alvarez to compete in their 154-pound grand prix.

His first fight was against Andre Amade, who hailed from the Chute Boxe Academy. Alvarez won via TKO due to strikes late in the first round.

Alvarez advanced to the second round of the tournament, where he defeated top-ranked Lightweight fighter Joachim Hansen on May 11, 2008, by unanimous decision.

In his fight at the Dream 5: Lightweight Grand Prix 2008 Final Round, Alvarez knocked out top-ranked Lightweight fighter Tatsuya Kawajiri in the tournament's semi-finals. The fight was awarded Fight of the Year by Sherdog for 2008. However, he was unable to advance in the tournament due to a cut and severe swelling under his right eye. Alvarez's replacement was Joachim Hansen, whom he defeated two months earlier. Hansen went on to win the tournament and capture the DREAM lightweight title.

Alvarez was scheduled to face UFC and PRIDE veteran Nick Diaz for the EliteXC 160 pound title on November 8, 2008. However, the fight was canceled when EliteXC's parent ProElite filed for bankruptcy. On New Year's Eve 2008, Alvarez fought Shinya Aoki at K-1 Dynamite!! 2008, losing by submission in the first round. He was subsequently signed to an exclusive contract with Bellator Fighting Championships.

Bellator Fighting Championships
Alvarez entered Bellator's lightweight tournament at Bellator's inaugural event on April 3, 2009. He fought Northern Irishman Greg Loughran, whom he submitted with a guillotine choke. His next fight at the tournament's semi-finals took place four weeks later at Bellator 5, against Eric Reynolds. After controlling the bout for two rounds, Alvarez used a rear-naked choke to submit Reynolds in the third.

Alvarez advanced to the lightweight tournament's finals, which took place at Bellator 12 on June 19, 2009. He fought and defeated Toby Imada, via a rear naked choke submission early in the second round, to become Bellator's first ever lightweight champion.

Alvarez faced Josh Neer in a non-title "Super fight" on May 6, 2010, at Bellator 17, in which he defeated Neer via rear-naked choke at 2:08 of round 2.

Alvarez was supposed to fight the Season 2 Lightweight Tournament Winner Pat Curran in a defense of his title, but his opponent was pulled from the card due to an injury in his right shoulder. He instead faced Roger Huerta at Bellator 33 held in his hometown of Philadelphia, Pennsylvania. He won the fight via TKO (doctor stoppage) between the 2nd and 3rd rounds. Alvarez then publicly stated that he wanted his next fight to be against the Strikeforce Lightweight Champion, Gilbert Melendez.

Alvarez defeated Pat Curran on April 2, 2011, via unanimous decision (49–46, 50–45, 50–45) to retain the Bellator Lightweight Championship at Bellator 39.

Alvarez faced Michael Chandler on November 19, 2011, at Bellator 58 in what was called by many publications as the '2011 Fight of the Year'. He was defeated by Chandler by rear naked choke in the fourth round. Chandler came in very aggressive in the first round, nearly finishing Alvarez.

Alvarez faced Shinya Aoki in a rematch at Bellator 66. He won the fight via TKO in the first round.

Alvarez faced Patricky Freire at Bellator 76, and defeated Freire in the first round via KO. This was the last fight on Alvarez's contract with Bellator and he passed the organization's contractual period of exclusive negotiation. Alvarez agreed in principle to signing with the UFC, reportedly including a share of pay-per-view revenue in addition to show and win money. Bellator, however, invoked a clause in the original contract to match the UFC's offer and re-sign Alvarez, matching the show and win purse and alleging that the pay-per-view cut in the UFC's offer to be strictly hypothetical. Alvarez and his management subsequently filed two lawsuits against Bellator.

On August 13, 2013, it was announced that Alvarez and Bellator had reached an agreement regarding his contract status. Alvarez faced Michael Chandler on November 2, 2013, at Bellator 106. He won via split decision in a close fight to become the Bellator Lightweight Champion for the second time. Much like the first time they met, Alvarez and Chandler engaged in another highly praised, back and forth battle. In the early rounds, Alvarez's jab and punching combinations found their home, damaging the left eye of Chandler, while Chandler was able to land multiple take down attempts and slams, and threatened a rear naked choke. The third round saw Eddie land with some crisp combinations. In the fourth round, Chandler landed a flying knee and some brutal ground and pound which hurt Eddie. By the fifth round, both fighters were busted up and bleeding badly. Chandler caught Alvarez in a neck crank, but Alvarez escaped and nearly finished the fight two times with rear-naked choke attempts. Bellator CEO Bjorn Rebney called the fight the best he'd ever seen. The decision was not without some controversy, with several media outlets scoring the fight for Chandler.

Rebney stated in the post fight press conference that the two would meet again in a rubber match, possibly on pay-per-view, once they both have recuperated. A third fight with Michael Chandler was set up for the main event of Bellator 120 on May 17, 2014. However, a week before the fight, it was announced that Alvarez had suffered a concussion and was forced to pull out of the fight.

In August 2014, new Bellator MMA president Scott Coker announced that Alvarez had been released from his contract with the promotion.

Ultimate Fighting Championship
On August 19, 2014, the UFC announced that they had signed Alvarez to a contract. He made his promotional debut against fan favorite and top contender Donald Cerrone in the co-main event at UFC 178 on September 27, 2014. Despite absorbing several flurries of clinch strikes from Alvarez through the first round, Cerrone recovered from a slow start and ended up controlling the rest of the fight with leg kicks that eventually hurt Alvarez. Alvarez lost the fight via a unanimous decision.

Alvarez was expected to face Benson Henderson on January 18, 2015, at UFC Fight Night 59. However, Alvarez pulled out of the bout and was replaced by Donald Cerrone.

Alvarez faced Gilbert Melendez on June 13, 2015, at UFC 188. Alvarez won the fight by split decision.

Alvarez faced Anthony Pettis on January 17, 2016, at UFC Fight Night 81. Despite being a heavy underdog going into the fight Alvarez was able to pressure and control Pettis. Alvarez won the fight by split decision.

UFC Lightweight Champion
In his fourth UFC fight, Alvarez faced Rafael dos Anjos on July 7, 2016, at UFC Fight Night 90 for the UFC Lightweight Championship. Despite being a three-to-one underdog going into the fight, Alvarez found his range early and rocked dos Anjos with a right hand just past the halfway point of the first round. He then swarmed dos Anjos and landed a barrage of unanswered punches before the fight was stopped via TKO. The win also earned Alvarez his first Performance of the Night bonus award.

Alvarez made his first title defense against the then UFC Featherweight Champion Conor McGregor on November 12, 2016, at UFC 205 in Madison Square Garden in New York City. It was a historic event for the UFC as it was the first UFC event in New York since the lifting of the state's long-standing ban on MMA. He lost the fight via TKO in the second round, after being outstruck in the first round.

Post-championship
In his first fight after losing the Lightweight title, Alvarez faced Dustin Poirier on May 13, 2017, at UFC 211. Poirier rocked Alvarez in the second round, but was subsequently dropped when Alvarez landed two illegal knees while Poirier was against the fence. With the Texas commission not operating under the new unified rules, referee Herb Dean declared the fight a No Contest as he did not believe Alvarez knew Poirier was a grounded opponent at the time.

In July 2017, it was announced that Alvarez would be a coach on The Ultimate Fighter 26 against former WSOF Lightweight Champion Justin Gaethje. A bout with Gaethje took place on December 2, 2017, at UFC 218. Alvarez won the fight via knockout in the third round. The fight earned both participants the Fight of the Night bonus award.

In the last fight of his UFC contract, Alvarez faced Dustin Poirier on July 28, 2018, in a rematch in the main event at UFC on Fox 30. He lost the fight via TKO in the second round.

ONE Championship
On October 15, 2018, it was announced that Alvarez signed with ONE Championship, set to make his promotional debut some time in early 2019 as part of their Lightweight division.

On November 7, 2018, it was announced that Alvarez would be one of eight participants in the ONE Lightweight World Grand Prix. On December 19, 2018, it was announced that Alvarez faced Timofey Nastyukhin at ONE Championship: A New Era on March 31, 2019 in promotion's inaugural event in Japan. He lost the fight by TKO in the first round.

Alvarez returned at ONE Championship: Dawn of Heroes on August 2, 2019 against former ONE lightweight champion Eduard Folayang. He won the fight via first round rear-naked choke after being dropped by a leg kick early in the round.

Alvarez was expected to face Saygid Arslaniev in the ONE Lightweight World Grand Prix final, but on September 26, 2019, news surfaced that he had to withdraw from the bout due to an injury. He was replaced by ONE Lightweight Champion Christian Lee. The bout with Arslaniev was to be rebooked for ONE Infinity 2 on 26 June 2020, but cancelled due to the Impact of the COVID-19 pandemic on sports.

Alvarez faced former ONE lightweight title challenger Iuri Lapicus at ONE on TNT 1 on April 7, 2021. The event took place in Singapore and aired in a primetime slot in the United States on TNT. He was disqualified after repeatedly throwing punches to the back of Lapicus's head. The call to disqualify Alvarez was considered controversial by multiple outlets and professional fighters as it appeared he was striking Lapicus's ear before Lapicus started turning his head. Alvarez appealed the final decision and the result was later overturned to a no contest.

Three weeks after his last bout, Alvarez faced Ok Rae Yoon at ONE on TNT 4 on April 28, 2021. He lost a close bout via unanimous decision.

On September 21, 2022, it was announced that Alvarez had agreed to be released from his contract with ONE Championship.

Bare-knuckle boxing career

Bare Knuckle Fighting Championship 
On March 1, 2023, it was announced by BKFC president Dave Feldman that Alvarez had signed with Bare Knuckle Fighting Championship. He is set to make his debut against Chad Mendes at BKFC 41 on April 29, 2023.

Personal life
Eddie married his high school sweetheart, Jamie, in 2008, and they have three sons and a daughter. Alvarez utilized his financial success to move his family out of Kensington and into Northeast Philadelphia following the birth of his first son, Eddie Jr.

Alvarez made two appearances on the television show Bully Beatdown on MTV, where he knocked out both of his opponents.

Championships and accomplishments

Amateur wrestling
National Prep School Wrestling Championships
National Prep All-American (2000, 2001)

Mixed martial arts
Ultimate Fighting Championship
UFC Lightweight Championship (One time)
Performance of the Night (One time)
Fight of the Night (One time)
Bellator Fighting Championships
Bellator Lightweight World Championship (Two times; First)
One successful title defense
Bellator Season 1 Lightweight Tournament Winner
BodogFIGHT
BodogFIGHT Welterweight Championship (One time; First)
Mixed Fighting Championships
MFC Welterweight Championship (One time; First; Last; Only)
Reality Fighting
Reality Fighting Welterweight Championship (One time; First)
FIGHT! Magazine
2008 Fight of the Year vs. Joachim Hansen on May 11
Inside MMA
2008 Fight of the Year Bazzie Award vs. Joachim Hansen on May 11
FightBooth.com
2012 King of Violence Award
fightmatrix.com
Lineal MMA Lightweight Championship (Two times)
Sherdog
2008 Fight of the Year vs. Tatsuya Kawajiri on July 21
Sports Illustrated
2008 Round of the Year vs. Tatsuya Kawajiri on July 21
Yahoo! Sports
2011 Fight of the Year vs. Michael Chandler on November 19
MMADNA.nl
2017 Fight of the Year  vs. Justin Gaethje 
World MMA Awards
2015 Comeback of the Year vs. Gilbert Melendez at UFC 188
2017 Fight of the Year vs. Justin Gaethje at UFC 218

Mixed martial arts record

|-
|Loss
|align=center|30–8 (2)
|Ok Rae Yoon 
|Decision (unanimous)
|ONE on TNT 4
|
|align=center|3
|align=center|5:00
|Kallang, Singapore
|
|-
| NC
|align=center|30–7 (2)
|Iuri Lapicus
|NC (overturned)
|ONE on TNT 1
|
|align=center|1
|align=center|1:02
|Kallang, Singapore
| 
|-
|Win
|align=center|30–7 (1)
|Eduard Folayang
|Submission (rear-naked choke)
|ONE Championship: Dawn of Heroes
|
|align=center|1
|align=center|2:16
|Pasay, Philippines
|
|-
|Loss
|align=center|29–7 (1)
|Timofey Nastyukhin
|TKO (punches)
|ONE Championship: A New Era
|
|align=center|1
|align=center|4:05
|Tokyo, Japan
|
|-
|Loss
|align=center|29–6 (1)
|Dustin Poirier
|TKO (punches)
|UFC on Fox: Alvarez vs. Poirier 2
|
|align=center|2
|align=center|4:05
|Calgary, Alberta, Canada
|
|-
|Win
|align=center|29–5 (1)
|Justin Gaethje
|KO (knee)
|UFC 218
|
|align=center|3
|align=center|3:28
|Detroit, Michigan, United States
|
|-
|NC
|align=center|28–5 (1)
|Dustin Poirier
|NC (illegal knees)
|UFC 211
|
|align=center|2
|align=center|4:12
|Dallas, Texas, United States
|
|-
|Loss
|align=center|28–5
|Conor McGregor
|TKO (punches)
|UFC 205
|
|align=center|2
|align=center|3:04
|New York City, New York, United States
|
|-
|Win
|align=center|28–4
|Rafael dos Anjos
|TKO (punches)
|UFC Fight Night: dos Anjos vs. Alvarez
|
|align=center|1
|align=center|3:49
|Las Vegas, Nevada, United States
|
|-
|Win
|align=center|27–4
|Anthony Pettis
|Decision (split)
|UFC Fight Night: Dillashaw vs. Cruz
|
|align=center|3
|align=center|5:00
|Boston, Massachusetts, United States
|
|-
|Win
|align=center|26–4
|Gilbert Melendez
|Decision (split)
|UFC 188
|
|align=center|3
|align=center|5:00
|Mexico City, Mexico
|
|-
| Loss
| align=center| 25–4
| Donald Cerrone
| Decision (unanimous)
| UFC 178
| 
| align=center| 3
| align=center| 5:00
| Las Vegas, Nevada, United States
|
|-
| Win
| align=center| 25–3
| Michael Chandler
| Decision (split)
| Bellator 106
| 
| align=center| 5
| align=center| 5:00
| Long Beach, California, United States
| 
|-
| Win
| align=center| 24–3
| Patricky Pitbull
| KO (head kick)
| Bellator 76
| 
| align=center| 1
| align=center| 4:54
| Windsor, Ontario, Canada
|
|-
| Win
| align=center| 23–3
| Shinya Aoki
| TKO (punches)
| Bellator 66
| 
| align=center| 1
| align=center| 2:14
| Cleveland, Ohio, United States
|
|-
| Loss
| align=center| 22–3
| Michael Chandler
| Submission (rear-naked choke)
| Bellator 58
| 
| align=center| 4
| align=center| 3:06
| Hollywood, Florida, United States
| 
|-
| Win
| align=center| 22–2
| Pat Curran
| Decision (unanimous)
| Bellator 39
| 
| align=center| 5
| align=center| 5:00
| Uncasville, Connecticut, United States
| 
|-
| Win
| align=center| 21–2
| Roger Huerta
| TKO (doctor stoppage)
| Bellator 33
| 
| align=center| 2
| align=center| 5:00
| Philadelphia, Pennsylvania, United States
| 
|-
| Win
| align=center| 20–2
| Josh Neer
| Technical Submission (standing rear-naked choke)
| Bellator 17
| 
| align=center| 2
| align=center| 2:08
| Boston, Massachusetts, United States
| 
|-
| Win
| align=center| 19–2
| Katsunori Kikuno
| Submission (arm-triangle choke)
| Dream 12
| 
| align=center| 2
| align=center| 3:42
| Osaka, Japan
|
|-
| Win
| align=center| 18–2
| Toby Imada
| Submission (rear-naked choke)
| Bellator 12
| 
| align=center| 2
| align=center| 2:34
| Hollywood, Florida, United States
| 
|-
| Win
| align=center| 17–2
| Eric Reynolds
| Submission (rear-naked choke)
| Bellator 5
| 
| align=center| 3
| align=center| 1:30
| Dayton, Ohio, United States
| 
|-
| Win
| align=center| 16–2
| Greg Loughran
| Submission (guillotine choke)
| Bellator 1
| 
| align=center| 1
| align=center| 2:44
| Hollywood, Florida, United States
| 
|-
| Loss
| align=center| 15–2
| Shinya Aoki
| Submission (heel hook)
| Fields Dynamite!! 2008
| 
| align=center| 1
| align=center| 1:32
| Saitama, Japan
| 
|-
| Win
| align=center| 15–1
| Tatsuya Kawajiri
| TKO (punches)
| Dream 5: Lightweight Grand Prix 2008 Final Round
| 
| align=center| 1
| align=center| 7:35
| Osaka, Japan
| 
|-
| Win
| align=center| 14–1
| Joachim Hansen
| Decision (unanimous)
| Dream 3: Lightweight Grand Prix 2008 Second Round
| 
| align=center| 2
| align=center| 5:00
| Saitama, Japan
| 
|-
| Win
| align=center| 13–1
| Andre Amade
| TKO (punches)
| Dream 1: Lightweight Grand Prix 2008 First Round
| 
| align=center| 1
| align=center| 6:47
| Saitama, Japan
| 
|-
| Win
| align=center| 12–1
| Ross Ebañez
| KO (punches)
| ShoXC: Elite Challenger Series
| 
| align=center| 2
| align=center| 2:32
| Atlantic City, New Jersey, United States
| 
|-
| Win
| align=center| 11–1
| Matt Lee
| Decision (unanimous)
| BodogFight: Alvarez vs. Lee
| 
| align=center| 3
| align=center| 5:00
| Trenton, New Jersey, United States
| 
|-
| Loss
| align=center| 10–1
| Nick Thompson
| TKO (punches)
| BodogFight: Clash of the Nations
| 
| align=center| 2
| align=center| 4:32
| Saint Petersburg, Russia
| 
|-
| Win
| align=center| 10–0
| Scott Henze
| TKO (corner stoppage)
| BodogFight: Costa Rica Combat
| 
| align=center| 1
| align=center| 4:13
| Playa Tambor, Costa Rica
|
|-
| Win
| align=center| 9–0
| Aaron Riley
| KO (punches)
| BodogFight: USA vs. Russia
| 
| align=center| 1
| align=center| 1:05
| Vancouver, British Columbia, Canada
| 
|-
| Win
| align=center| 8–0
| Hidenobu Koike
| TKO (punches)
| MARS 4: New Deal
| 
| align=center| 1
| align=center| 1:26
| Tokyo, Japan
|
|-
| Win
| align=center| 7–0
| Derrick Noble
| KO (punches)
| MFC: Russia vs. USA
| 
| align=center| 1
| align=center| 1:01
| Atlantic City, New Jersey, United States
|
|-
| Win
| align=center| 6–0
| Daisuke Hanazawa
| TKO (punches)
| Euphoria: USA vs. Japan
| 
| align=center| 1
| align=center| 4:00
| Atlantic City, New Jersey, United States
|
|-
| Win
| align=center| 5–0
| Danil Veselov
| TKO (punches)
| Euphoria: USA vs. Russia
| 
| align=center| 2
| align=center| 2:15
| Atlantic City, New Jersey, United States
|
|-
| Win
| align=center| 4–0
| Seichi Ikemoto
| TKO (punches)
| Euphoria: USA vs. The World
| 
| align=center| 2
| align=center| 4:25
| Atlantic City, New Jersey, United States
|
|-
| Win
| align=center| 3–0
| Chris Schlesinger
| Submission (guillotine choke)
| Reality Fighting 7
| 
| align=center| 1
| align=center| 1:00
| Atlantic City, New Jersey, United States
| 
|-
| Win
| align=center| 2–0
| Adam Fearon
| TKO (submission to punches)
| Ring of Combat 6
| 
| align=center| 1
| align=center| 2:06
| Elizabeth, New Jersey, United States
|
|-
| Win
| align=center| 1–0
| Anthony Ladonna
| KO (punch)
| Ring of Combat 5
| 
| align=center| 1
| align=center| 3:57
| Elizabeth, New Jersey, United States
|

See also
List of Bellator MMA alumni
List of male mixed martial artists

Notes

References

External links

1984 births
Living people
American people of Irish descent
American people of Puerto Rican descent
American male mixed martial artists
Mixed martial artists from Pennsylvania
Lightweight mixed martial artists
Welterweight mixed martial artists
Mixed martial artists utilizing boxing
Mixed martial artists utilizing catch wrestling
Mixed martial artists utilizing Brazilian jiu-jitsu
Bellator MMA champions
Ultimate Fighting Championship champions
Ultimate Fighting Championship male fighters
American practitioners of Brazilian jiu-jitsu
People awarded a black belt in Brazilian jiu-jitsu